Carabus sylvestris kolbi is a subspecies of beetle in the family Carabidae that can be found in Austria and Slovenia.

References

sylvestris kolbi
Beetles described in 1927